This is a list of Egyptian American writers.

 Nonie Darwish, author and writer
 Victor Hassine, prison writer 
 Lucette Lagnado, author and journalist

See also
List of Egyptian writers

References

Egyptian American writers, List of